Gary Locke (born 16 June 1975 in Edinburgh) is a Scottish professional football player and coach. Locke both played for and managed Heart of Midlothian and Kilmarnock, and has also managed Raith Rovers and Cowdenbeath. He is currently Club Ambassador at Hearts.

Playing career
Locke, a midfielder, went to Lasswade Primary and High School in Bonnyrigg and started his career at Hearts before joining Bradford City in January 2001 who were at the time in the Premier League. Locke finished his career at Kilmarnock where he scored once against Dunfermline.

Locke picked up 10 caps for Scotland under-21s while at Hearts. Injuries were a major problem throughout Locke's career and while he was club captain when Hearts won the 1997–98 Scottish Cup, he did not play in the final due to injury.

Locke played under manager Jim Jefferies at all of his clubs. He retired aged 34, at the end of the 2008–09 season.

Locke has 3 daughters, eldest daughter Keira Locke, there is no further information on his other 2 daughters.

Coaching career
After retiring as a player, Locke was in line to join the Kilmarnock coaching staff, but the collapse of Setanta led to reduced TV income for SPL clubs and Kilmarnock decided they could not offer Locke a position.

After Jim Jefferies was appointed Hearts manager for the second time in January 2010, Locke was appointed First Team Coach. He was placed in caretaker charge of the team after the departure of John McGlynn in February 2013. He was subsequently appointed on a permanent basis, on a contract until the end of the 2013–14 season. In March 2013 Locke's Hearts lost 3–2 to St Mirren in the Scottish League Cup Final. Hearts entered administration in June 2013, which meant that the club were placed under a transfer embargo and were deducted 15 points in the 2013–14 Scottish Premiership season. On 11 August 2013, Locke won the first Edinburgh derby in the new Scottish Premiership with a 76-minute header from striker Callum Paterson at Tynecastle Stadium. Hearts were relegated to the Scottish Championship at the end of the season and new owner Ann Budge decided not to retain Locke.

In June 2014, Locke returned to Kilmarnock as assistant manager. He was put in caretaker charge of the team after Allan Johnston left Kilmarnock in February 2015. Locke was then appointed on a permanent basis in April 2015. He resigned from the Kilmarnock job on 30 January 2016, with the club sitting second-bottom of the 2015–16 Scottish Premiership.

Following the departure of Ray McKinnon to Dundee United, Locke was appointed manager of Scottish Championship side Raith Rovers in May 2016, signing on a two-year deal. After a run of 14 games without a win, Locke was sacked by the club on 7 February 2017 after a 1–0 loss to Greenock Morton.

Shortly after leaving Kirkcaldy, Locke was appointed manager of fellow Fife club Cowdenbeath. After helping Cowdenbeath avoid relegation by winning a playoff with East Kilbride, Locke left the club during the close season to take an ambassadorial role with Hearts.

Managerial statistics

Managerial achievements 
Cowdenbeath
Scottish League Two play-offs: 2016-17

References

External links

Appearances  at londonhearts.com

1975 births
Association football midfielders
Bradford City A.F.C. players
Heart of Midlothian F.C. players
Heart of Midlothian F.C. managers
Heart of Midlothian F.C. non-playing staff
Kilmarnock F.C. non-playing staff
Kilmarnock F.C. players
Living people
People educated at Lasswade High School Centre
Premier League players
Scotland under-21 international footballers
Scottish Football League players
Scottish football managers
Scottish footballers
Scottish Premier League managers
Scottish Premier League players
Scottish Professional Football League managers
Footballers from Edinburgh
English Football League players
Kilmarnock F.C. managers
Raith Rovers F.C. managers
Cowdenbeath F.C. managers